Stefano Missio (born April 1, 1972, in Udine) is an Italian filmmaker

He has made various documentaries among which When Italy was not a poor country, about Italy in the 1960s narrated by Joris Ivens, and Scusi, dov'è il Nord Est? produced by Fandango and On Line Productions for Arte (broadcast as Succes à l'italienne) and broadcast in Italy by Tele+. In 2005 he directed Il Ponte, a  fiction short-movie, screenplayed by Francesco Tullio Altan, starring Carlo Mazzacurati and Valentina Fago. His last work, Che Guevara - The body and the legend (2007), was broadcast in 12 countries. He lives and works in Paris.

Filmography
When Italy wasn't a poor country  (Quando l'Italia non era un paese povero; 1997)
Siamo troppo sazi (1998)
Scusi, dov’è il Nord Est? (2000)
Il Ponte (2005)
Trumpets' Republic, (Трубачка Република; 2006)
Che Guevara - The body and the legend (2007)

References and sources

books 
Hans Schoots, Joris Ivens. A Biography of Joris Ivens, Amsterdam, 2000.
Aldo Grasso, Storia della televisione italiana, Garzanti, Milan, 2000.
Virgilio Tosi, Cinema e Utopia, Bulzoni, Rome, 2002.

newspaper 
 Alberto Farassino. Torna l'Italia censurata di Mattei e Joris Ivens. La Repubblica, April 28, 1999.
 Maurizio Porro. Tinto Brass scopre il film verità voluto da Mattei. Corriere della Sera, April 28, 1999.
 Giovanni Petitti. Ivens Ritrovato. Cineforum, n. 374.
 Tom Haines. Laughter reigns, war memories fade at annual Balkans brass festival. The Boston Globe, June 27, 2004.
 Silvana Silvestri. Missio e i misteri di una copia RAI. Il Manifesto, March 30, 2007.
 Lucia Sgueglia. Un'altra Russia. Il Manifesto, December 22, 2007.

External links

1972 births
Living people
People from Udine
Italian film directors